Henry Richard Krygier OBE  (9 September 1917 – 27 September 1986), was a Polish-born Jewish Australian anti-communist publisher and journalist, and a founder of Quadrant magazine.

Education and career
He was born in 1917 in Warsaw, of Jewish parents, and as a law student was active in student politics at the Józef Piłsudski (Warsaw) University. His early sympathies with communism were shattered by events such as the Soviet purges of the 1930s and the Molotov-Ribbentrop pact and he remained a vigorous lifelong anti-communist.

In 1939, he and his wife, Roma, escaped to Kaunas, Lithuania, where they obtained Japanese transit visas. They reached Sydney, via Vladivostok, Japan and Shanghai, in 1941. In Sydney, he was active in Polish journalism and import-export businesses. He was a supporter of the Australian Labor Party, and in 1947 he became a naturalized citizen.

Krygier's anti-totalitarian, liberal, democratic perspective led him to sympathies with the international Congress for Cultural Freedom, founded in West Berlin in 1950. In 1954, he formed and became secretary of its Australian arm, the Australian Committee (later Association) for Cultural Freedom.

The Association's principal achievement, as well as his, was the creation in 1956 of the literary-political magazine Quadrant, under the editorship of James McAuley. Krygier was publisher, business manager and fund-raiser. In addition, he organised lecture tours of prominent overseas political and cultural figures and conferences on the problems on establishing democracy in developing states.

He remained active in Quadrant up to his death in 1986. For the last four years of his life, he wrote a regular Quadrant column, but he had contributed a few other pieces to the magazine before then.

Personal life
He married Romualda (Roma) Halpern in Warsaw in 1939.

They had two children, a daughter and a son, Martin Krygier (born 1949) who is the Gordon Samuels Professor of Law and Social Theory at the University of New South Wales. Richard Krygier died of cancer on 27 September 1986 at Darlinghurst, New South Wales and was cremated.

References

Further reading
Peter Coleman, The Liberal Conspiracy: The Congress for Cultural Freedom and the Struggle for the Mind of Postwar Europe, New York 1989.
Various authors, "Tributes to Richard Krygier", in: Quadrant, vol. 30, no. 11, November 1986.

External links
 Richard Krygier interviewed by J.D.B. Miller  at National Library of Australia

1917 births
1986 deaths
Australian Officers of the Order of the British Empire
Australian publishers (people)
Australian magazine founders
Polish emigrants to Australia
Australian anti-communists
Australian Jews
Australian people of Polish-Jewish descent
20th-century Australian journalists